This is a list of listed buildings in Faaborg-Midtfyn Municipality, Denmark.

''Note:: This list is incomplete. A complete list of listed buildings in Vordingborg Municipality can be found on Danish Wikipedia.

The list

5600 Faaborg

5640

5750 Ringe

5772 Kværndrup

5792 Årslev

Delisted buildings

References

External links

 Danish Agency of Culture

 
Faaborg-Midtfyn